Udgorn Seion (in English, the Trumpet of Zion or Zion's Trumpet) was the official Welsh-language periodical of the Church of Jesus Christ of Latter-day Saints (LDS Church) between 1849 and 1862.

Udgorn Seion was the successor publication to Prophwyd y Jubili, which was the first Welsh-language Latter Day Saint periodical. In the final edition of Prophwyd y Jubili, editor Dan Jones announced that he would be returning to the United States and that the church publication would be renamed Udgorn Seion. The editor for the renamed publication was John Davis, a wealthy Latter Day Saint bachelor.

Originally, Udgorn Seion was published monthly, like its predecessor. In 1851, it began to be issued biweekly and in 1858 it became a weekly. When Dan Jones returned to Wales for his second mission, he became the new editor of the publication. Subsequent editors were Daniel Daniels, Benjamin Evans, and George Q. Cannon. Udgorn Seion was published on presses in a variety of locations, including at Carmarthen, Merthyr Tydfil and Swansea in Wales and at Liverpool in England.

Circulation for Udgorn Seion peaked at about 2000 during Davis's tenure as editor and was at about 500 for the three years prior to its demise in 1862. Its readership was continually diminished by Latter-day Saint emigration to Utah. In 1862, editor (and head of the LDS Church in Europe) George Q. Cannon decided to suspend publication and encourage Welsh speaking Latter-day Saints to read the English-language Millennial Star. Since 1862, the LDS Church has not published any Welsh-language periodicals.

The full name of the publication was Udgorn Seion, neu, Seren y Saint; yn cynnwys egwyddorion "Goruchwyliaeth cyflawnder yr amseroedd," mewn traethodau, llythyron, hanesion, prydyddiaeth, etc. (in English, "Zion's Trumpet, or, Star of the Saints; containing the principles of the "Dispensation of the fulness of times," in treatises, letters, accounts, poetry, etc.").

See also
 List of Latter Day Saint periodicals

References
 Zion's Trumpet at WelshMormonHistory.org

Further reading

Defunct newspapers published in the United Kingdom
The Church of Jesus Christ of Latter-day Saints periodicals
Publications established in 1849
Publications disestablished in 1862
The Church of Jesus Christ of Latter-day Saints in Wales
Welsh-language literature
1849 in Christianity
History of Christianity in Wales
1849 establishments in Wales
1862 disestablishments in the United Kingdom